Adato is a Jewish surname. Notable people with the surname include:

Orit Adato (born 1955), former Israeli military commander and Israel Prison Service Commissioner
Perry Miller Adato (born 1920), American film director
Rachel Adato (born 1947), Israeli gynaecologist, lawyer and politician

Jewish surnames